A list of films produced in the decade of the 1940s. There are 5 (five) movies were released in this decade.

A-Z film

References

Assamese
1940s
Assamese